FC Reutov was a Russian football team from Reutov. It played professionally from 2003 to 2008. Their best result was 4th place in the Zone West of the Russian Second Division in 2006. Football in Reutov was continued with FC Prialit Reutov, founded after FC Reutov was dissolved, in 2009.

External links
  Team history at KLISF

Association football clubs established in 2001
Association football clubs disestablished in 2009
Defunct football clubs in Russia
Football in Moscow Oblast
2001 establishments in Russia
2009 disestablishments in Russia
Reutov